The Twin Dilemma is the seventh and final serial of the 21st season of the British science fiction television series Doctor Who, which was first broadcast in four twice-weekly parts from 22 March to 30 March 1984.

In the serial, the alien Gastropod Mestor (Edwin Richfield) plots to explode the sun of the planet Jaconda to scatter his eggs throughout the universe to conquer it.

It was the first to star Colin Baker as the Sixth Doctor uniquely being the final story of the season.

Plot

After his regeneration, the Sixth Doctor starts behaving erratically. He goes to the wardrobe looking for a new outfit and finds a glaring, mismatched, brightly coloured coat to which he immediately takes a shine. Peri tells him that he could not go outside wearing such an awful garb, to which the Doctor takes offence.

Two twins, Romulus and Remus Sylveste, receive a visitation from a mysterious old man called Professor Edgeworth.  They question how he managed to get inside their house; he tells them he will return when their father is there, then abducts them. They arrive on a spacecraft in deep space. Edgeworth then communicates with his superior, a slug-like creature called Mestor, who instructs Edgeworth to take the twins to Titan 3.

In the console room, the Doctor has a funny turn, quoting a poem about a Peri — a good and beautiful fairy in Persian mythology, but one which used to be evil. The Doctor accuses her of being evil, and of being an alien spy before rushing toward her and throttling her. He catches a sight of his own manic face in a mirror and collapses in a heap, releasing Peri. When she tells him that he tried to kill her, he initially denies he could be capable of such an act, but seeing how terrified of him she is, decides he must become a hermit on the desolate asteroid Titan 3.

The twins' father contacts the authorities; he found Zanium in their room — a sure sign of intergalactic kidnap. A Commander Lang begins the pursuit and soon finds a suspicious ship previously reported missing. He tries to contact it, but it enters warp drive — something that class of ship is not designed to do.

On Titan 3 the Doctor and Peri hear the crash landing of a craft. Examining its wreckage, they find the concussed body of Commander Lang. They take him back to the TARDIS where he reveals his whole squadron has been destroyed. Believing the Doctor to be responsible, he points his gun at the Doctor and threatens to kill him.

Peri pleads with Lang, telling him that the Doctor had in fact saved him, but he faints away. The Doctor is not keen to treat Lang, more concerned for his own life, but eventually agrees to Peri's persuasion.

Edgeworth argues with Romulus and Remus, making them do Mestor's work. He scolds them for setting up a distress signal, so they are not allowed to use electronic equipment to solve the equations they have been set. An image of Mestor appears and gives the twins a more blunt threat — work for him or have their minds destroyed.

On the TARDIS scanner, the Doctor and Peri see a building — something which has no place on an uninhabited asteroid. Leaving Lang behind, they find a tunnel which may lead to the building, but on exploring find two aliens wielding guns. The Doctor cowers in fear and pleads with them to kill Peri instead of him. They are led off and are brought before Edgeworth. The Doctor claims to be a pilgrim to Titan 3, but Noma, one of the aliens, says they are spies and should be shot. The Doctor suddenly recognises Edgeworth as an old friend – Azmael, master of Jaconda, whom he last saw two incarnations ago. When the Doctor sees Romulus and Remus and discovers it is Azmael who has abducted them, he is disgusted. Azmael teleports away with the twins and the aliens, leaving the Doctor and Peri locked in the building. The Doctor starts to break the lock's combination, but Peri discovers Noma has set the base to self-destruct. The Doctor improvises a solution to teleport them back to the TARDIS. Peri makes a successful return, but weeps when the Doctor has not appeared when she sees the base explode on the scanner.

A glimpse of the Doctor is seen appearing in the TARDIS; he was delayed returning because he was using Peri's watch to synchronise their arrival, but the watch had stopped. The Doctor is surprised at Peri's compassion when she thought he had died.

On Jaconda, Mestor is seen putting one of the bird-like Jacondans to death for a petty offence. The TARDIS arrives, but instead of the beautiful planet the Doctor is expecting, he, Peri and Lang find a desolate wasteland covered with giant Gastropod trails. The Doctor is reluctant to go to the palace, scared for his own life, but is persuaded to take Lang there. In the palace corridors they see murals depicting Jaconda's history, depicting the slugs of myth – but it appears that they are now all too real. After avoiding Gastropods, Lang gets stuck in their slime trail.

Azmael takes the twins to his laboratory and shows them a storeroom full of Gastropod eggs. Mestor arrives and tries to persuade them that his aims are benevolent. Azmael begs him to stop reading his thoughts and stop Noma watching his every move. He agrees and leaves. Azmael explains to the Twins that Mestor usurped him as leader of Jaconda and outlines a plan to draw two outlying planets into the same orbit as Jaconda. The Twins' genius is required to stabilise those planets in their new orbit. The Doctor, leaving Peri and Lang behind, finds Azmael's lab. In a manic fit of pique, he attacks Azmael, but is restrained by a Jacondan and the Twins. The Doctor apologises to Azmael but demands to know what is going on.

Meanwhile, Peri is captured by Jacondan guards and brought before Mestor. When Lang escapes to Azmael's lab and informs them what has happened, the Doctor finally shows compassion for her when he thinks she might die.

Mestor refrains from killing Peri immediately, finding her appearance pleasing. Jacondan guards arrive in Azmael's lab and seize the Doctor. The Doctor tells Mestor that he ought to allow him to assist with the dangerous operation of moving the planets, as a single mistake could blow a hole in that corner of the universe. Back the laboratory, Azmael informs the Doctor of the details of the plan to bring the planets into the same orbit — they will be placed in different time zones using time travel technology that Mestor stole from Azmael. The Doctor realises that, as the other planets are smaller than Jaconda, bringing them closer to Jaconda's sun will lead to catastrophe. The Doctor enters the egg storeroom and is disturbed that they have no nutritional mucus. He tries to cut one open with a laser cutter; the shell is impenetrable, but the egg reacts slightly to the heat. The Doctor realises they have been designed to withstand the heat of an exploding sun — the explosion of the Jacondan sun will scatter the eggs throughout the universe. When they hatch, the Gastropods will conquer the universe.

The one remaining Jacondan, Drak in the lab collapses dead, his mind burnt out. Mestor had been using him as a monitor and knows the full details of what has been discussed. Peri, Lang and the Twins return to the TARDIS, whilst the Doctor and Azmael go to confront Mestor. When Mestor refuses to abandon his plans, the Doctor hurls a vial of acid taken from the lab at him, but a force field protects Mestor. Mestor threatens to possess the Doctor's mind and body and demonstrates by taking control of Azmael's body. Azmael tells him to destroy Mestor's body before he can return to it, which he does with a further vial. Then Azmael, in his last regeneration, forces himself to regenerate — killing himself — and in doing so destroys Mestor. Dying, Azmael says he has no regrets and that one of his fondest memories was a time spent with the Doctor by a fountain.

The Doctor and Peri return to the TARDIS; Lang decides to stay behind on Jaconda to assist with their rebuilding. When Peri tells the Doctor off for being rude, he reminds her that he is an alien, with different "values and customs", and that: "No matter what else happens, I am the Doctor... whether you like it or not!"

Production
The Doctor is unusually violent at the start of this episode, even attempting to strangle Peri. The intention was to create a Doctor that was initially unlikeable, but would gradually reveal a kind-hearted soul (glimpsed in Revelation of the Daleks). This was also intended to be a contrast to the instantly likeable Tom Baker and Peter Davison Doctors. However, in later interviews, director Peter Moffatt said that the original idea was merely to have the Doctor in a much more energetic state than he was during the Fifth Doctor's début story Castrovalva. Colin Baker said during a 2003 documentary celebrating the series' 40th anniversary that "the idea was that over the many, many years I would be playing the part, the outer layers would gradually peel away, revealing the kind-hearted soul."

At least one aspect of Steven's original script featured the Jaconda and Gastropods being dropped totally early in the fourth episode without resolution to the plot, with the final battle taking place in another dimension against a being called Azlan who was controlling Mestor all along.

The cat badge worn by the Sixth Doctor on his lapel for this story was handmade and painted by Suzie Trevor and purchased for the programme from a specialist badge shop in central London. For each subsequent story, the Doctor was to wear a different cat badge to symbolise that he was a "travelling cat of different walks."

Besides being adjusted for the new Doctor, the opening credits underwent additional modifications with this episode. A prism-colour effect is added and the series logo takes on a somewhat bluish hue (which also results in it appearing slightly curved in comparison to the version introduced during Tom Baker's era). The theme music remains the same version as that introduced in 1980. Prior to this, the opening sequences of the Second, Third, Fourth, and Fifth Doctor eras had incorporated a still photograph of the lead actor. For the Sixth Doctor opening this was changed to using two photographs – one of the Doctor with a smile which changes to a second image showing the Doctor grinning. This limited animation would continue with the opening sequence for the Seventh Doctor.

Cast notes
Colin Baker also provides, uncredited, the voice of a Jacondan at Freighter Control in part three. Dennis Chinnery had previously appeared as Albert C. Richardson in the William Hartnell story The Chase and as Gharman in the Tom Baker story Genesis of the Daleks. Edwin Richfield had previously appeared as Captain Hart alongside Jon Pertwee's Doctor in The Sea Devils. Kevin McNally later played Henry in the audio play Spider's Shadow, and Professor Eustacius Jericho in the Jodie Whittaker episodes Village of the Angels, Survivors of the Flux, and The Vanquishers . Seymour Green had previously played Hargreaves in The Seeds of Doom. Helen Blatch had earlier been a voice artist in The Deadly Assassin.

Outside references
Shortly before the Doctor assaults Peri in a paranoid rage, he quotes the line "One morn a peri at the gate Of Eden stood disconsolate" and asks Peri to identify its author.  The answer is Thomas Moore, in his poem Lalla Rookh.

The first two instalments of the BBV Stranger video series appear to borrow the premise of the Doctor's desire to become a hermit to atone for mistakes he has made. Since the Stranger is played by Colin Baker and his companion Miss Brown is played by Nicola Bryant, it is often viewed as a "What-If" scenario, despite the fact that the BBV production could not legally use the Doctor Who characters.

Broadcast and reception

Where the previous serial, The Caves of Androzani, is frequently cast among the very best of all Doctor Who stories, the fandom often holds this serial the polar opposite, commonly regarding it as one of the very worst serials in the history of the series. The review of the story in Doctor Who: The Television Companion describes The Twin Dilemma as "painful to watch", describing the Doctor's erratic behaviour as "forced and artificial, and succeed[s] only in alienating the viewer." The review also argues the script "leaves much to be desired" and that the direction is uninteresting, giving the whole story "a rather tacky, B-movie feel to it".  In SFX #150 new series producer Russell T Davies cites this story as "the beginning of the end" of Doctor Who. Tat Wood and Lawrence Miles, reviewing the story in the book About Time, noted that the divide in quality between The Caves of Androzani and The Twin Dilemma "felt wrong at the time, and still feels wrong now". They also asked "How could anyone have thought that this story, of juvenile space monsters, meaningless plans and never-ending cop-outs, was ever workable?".  In his review for Radio Times, Patrick Mulkern gave the serial a negative reception, stating: "If The Twin Dilemma is individually a disaster, it also establishes the opening titles, the Doctor’s clothes, his behaviour and sniping banter with Peri – all part of an unpleasant shift in tone that would permeate and eventually poleaxe the era. How did Nathan-Turner and Saward think that this approach might be in any way acceptable?" A 1998 poll by Doctor Who Magazine ranked the serial the second worst of all time (the Children in Need special Dimensions in Time was ranked lowest), while a 2003 poll by fansite Outpost Gallifrey ranked it worst of all, below even Dimensions in Time. In 2009, another Doctor Who Magazine poll of the 200 stories produced up to that point saw the serial finish in last place again, along with finishing last in every single age group that voted (although Dimensions in Time technically scored lower, it was no longer included in the main poll due to its lack of canonicity within the series and was instead placed in a spin-off section). A similar poll in 2014 placed the story in last place once again.

Commercial releases

In print

A novelisation of this serial, written by Saward, was published in hardback by Target Books in October 1985, and in paperback in March 1986. The cover illustration originally featured Colin Baker; however, when Baker's agent enquired about a royalty, the decision was taken to not feature him on the cover and a replacement was commissioned. This adaptation is notable for Saward's convoluted attempt at explaining in detail how the regeneration process works.

In January 2012, an audiobook of the novelisation was released, read by Colin Baker.

Home media
The Twin Dilemma was released on VHS in May 1992. The tape was available exclusively through branches of Woolworths as part of a special promotion. A general release followed in February 1993. It was released on DVD on 7 September 2009 in the United Kingdom and on 5 January 2010 in the United States. This serial was released as part of the Doctor Who DVD Files in Issue 127 on 13 November 2013.

References

External links

Reviews
 The Twin Dilemma in Time Space Visualiser

Target novelisation

Doctor Who serials novelised by Eric Saward
Sixth Doctor serials
1984 British television episodes